The Cascadian was an American named train of the Great Northern Railway on its route between Seattle and Spokane, Washington. The Cascadian was officially listed as a streamliner on August 15, 1954.

The Great Northern Railway operated a daylight train between Seattle and Spokane that traversed the Cascade Mountains through the Cascade Tunnel. It then descended the eastern slopes through the Cashmere – Wenatchee apple growing region before crossing the Columbia River and climbing up to the high Columbia plateau and the wheat fields of the Inland Empire. Most passengers between these points traveled in the Empire Builder or Western Star overnight.
Each of the two train sets consisted of a baggage-storage-mail car, a baggage 30’ Railway Post Office car — both generally heavyweights but painted in the Empire Builder dark-green and orange color scheme. Next came prewar 58 seat Luxury Coaches in the 938–943 class with up to three being assigned to each consist on the busiest days. When the Cascadian was officially listed as a streamliner on August 15, 1954 it was when the railroad added the café-coach cars to the Cascadians. These cars, originally heavy-weights, had recently been remodeled and streamlined by GN shops in Minneapolis and carried the markers for the Cascadians. These cars featured 18 revenue coach seats and a café with seating for sixteen. The Cascadian was powered by either EMD F-units or passenger equipped GP units between Seattle and Scenic, and between Wenatchee and Spokane. Between Scenic and Wenatchee was the electrified district of the Great Northern Railway and electric locomotives were assigned as power in this area until the electrified zone was discontinued in 1956. At that time whatever power assigned in Spokane or Seattle ran through. The Cascadian made its last run on August 15, 1959.

References

Passenger trains of the Great Northern Railway (U.S.)
Named passenger trains of the United States
Railway services introduced in 1954
Railway services discontinued in 1959